The 2000 Northern Iowa Panthers football team represented the University of Northern Iowa in the 2000 NCAA Division I-AA football season as a member of the Gateway Football Conference. Led by Mike Dunbar in his fourth and final season as head coach, the Panthers compiled an overall record of 7–4 with a mark of 3–3 in conference play, placing fourth in the Gateway.

Schedule

References

Northern Iowa
Northern Iowa Panthers football seasons
Northern Iowa Panthers football